Siddareddy palem is a village in Chennuru panchayat, Dagadarthi mandal of Andhra Pradesh in India.

References 

Villages in Nellore district